This is a list of VTV dramas released in 1999.

←1998 - 1999 - 2000→

VTV Tet dramas
These films were released on VTV channels during Tet holiday.

VTV1 Friday night dramas

Unstable time slot on Friday night for Vietnamese dramas
Following the previous year, the Friday night (around 21:00) on VTV1 was spent to air Vietnamese films more often than the other time slots but it was unstable. It sometimes was used as an extension for foreign drama time slots. In some other cases, the broadcast schedule for several Vietnamese dramas was expanded to non-Fridays. The list below includes some of the films that did not air on Fridays.

Friday night dramas
Starting from first full week of October, Vietnamese dramas was aired periodically around 21:00 on every Friday night on VTV1.

Note: The time slot was delayed on 31 Dec due to special event.

For The First Time On VTV3 Screen dramas
These dramas were aired under the name of the program For The First Time On VTV3 Screen (Vietnamese: Lần đầu tiên trên màn ảnh VTV3).

Until 1 June, the program followed the schedule from previous year which it airs around 21:00 on every Tuesday night.

From 10 Jul to 22 Jul, the program was moved to Thursday night.

From 23 Jul to 24 Oct, the program released 2 issues per week with the time slot on every Friday & Sunday night.

Since 30 Oct, it changed one more time, reduced back to 1 issues per week with the time slot moved to Saturday afternoon.

VTV3 Sunday Literature & Art dramas
These dramas air in early Sunday afternoon on VTV3 as a part of the program Sunday Literature & Art (Vietnamese: Văn nghệ Chủ Nhật).

Note: The airtime with an asterisk (*) at the end indicates that the broadcast order is undefined

See also
 List of dramas broadcast by Vietnam Television (VTV)
 List of dramas broadcast by Hanoi Radio Television (HanoiTV)
 List of dramas broadcast by Vietnam Digital Television (VTC)
List of television programmes broadcast by Vietnam Television (VTV)

References

External links
VTV.gov.vn – Official VTV Website 
VTV.vn – Official VTV Online Newspaper 

Vietnam Television original programming
1999 in Vietnamese television